Balaband (also Romanized as Bālāband) is a village in Goli Jan Rural District, in the Central District of Tonekabon County, Mazandaran Province, Iran. At the 2006 census, its population was 365, in 107 families.

References 

Populated places in Tonekabon County